Summit Lake is a lake in the east-central part of the Canadian province of Saskatchewan in Narrow Hills Provincial Park. It is situated in a glacier-formed valley in the Cub Hills and the boreal forest ecozone of Canada. It is located north of Lost Echo Lake and is accessed from Highway 913. There are no communities or settlements on the lake.

Several small rivers flow into Summit Lake from the surrounding hills and muskeg. Its outflow is at the western end and, via a short river, it flows into Caribou Creek, which flows south through the lakes of Lost Echo, Lower Echo, Upper Fishing, and Lower Fishing and is a tributary of the south flowing Stewart Creek. Stewart Creek flows into the east flowing Torch River, which is a tributary of the Saskatchewan River and part of the Hudson Bay drainage basin.

Fish species 
Fish commonly found in Summit Lake include lake trout, northern pike, and walleye.

See also 
List of lakes of Saskatchewan
Hudson Bay drainage basin

References 

Lakes of Saskatchewan
Northern Saskatchewan Administration District